The Forbidden Room is a 1977 thriller film directed by Dino Risi. It is based on the novel Un'anima persa by Giovanni Arpino. The film was co-production between Italy and France by Dean Film and Les Productions Fox Europa.

Plot

Cast 
 Vittorio Gassman as Fabio Stolz
 Catherine Deneuve as Elisa Stolz
 Danilo Mattei as Tino
 Anicée Alvina as Lucia
 Ester Carloni as Annetta
 Michele Capnist as Il Duca
 Gino Cavalieri as Prof. Sattin

Production
The Forbidden Room was based on the novel L'anima persa written by Giovanni Arpino and published in 1966. Director Dino Risi had previously adapted Arpino's novel previously, as Profumo di donna.

Risi's adaptation of L'anima persa changed the novels location from Turin to Venice and changed the names, features and characteristics of some characters such as Tino's uncle and aunt Galla.

Release
The Forbidden Room was distributed theatrically in Italy by Fox/Dean Film on 20 January 1977. In Italy, the film grossed a total of 857,364,083 Italian lire domestically. The film was released in France on 23 March 1977 as Âmes perdues.

See also 
List of Italian films of 1977

References

Footnotes

Sources

External links

Italian thriller films
French thriller films
Films directed by Dino Risi
Films set in Venice
Films scored by Francis Lai
1970s Italian films
1970s French films